The 2016–17 Algerian Cup was the 53rd edition of the Algerian Cup. The eventual winners were CR Belouizdad who qualified for the 2018 CAF Confederation Cup.

Teams

Round of 64
The Round of 64 draw took place on 13 November and was broadcast live on Algérie 3. All 32 Round of 64 ties are due to be played on the weekend of 24 November. 48 teams from the qualifying competition join the 16 teams from Ligue Professionnelle 1 to compete in this round. The round includes one team from Level 6 still in the competition, IRB Béchar Djedid, who are the lowest-ranked team in this round.

Round of 32

Round of 16

Quarter-finals

Semi-finals

Final

Notes

References

Algerian Cup
Algerian Cup
Algerian Cup